Eric Keenleyside (born October 11, 1957) is a Canadian actor.

Early life
Eric was born in St. Stephen, New Brunswick, grew up in London, Ontario, and spent time in Brisbane, Australia. He received a Bachelor of Fine Arts (acting) from the University of Windsor (Ontario, Canada) in 1980 and apprenticed at the Stratford Shakespeare Festival. He has lived and worked in Toronto, Los Angeles, and Vancouver.

Career
In the early and mid 1990s he appeared in series such as Street Justice, Hawkeye, Madison, Highlander: The Series and Titanic. In 1999, he appeared in Guy Ferland's comedy film Delivered.
He appeared in an episode of The King of Queens in 2000. In 2006, Keenleyside appeared in the TV film Murder on Pleasant Drive.

In 2007 he played Robert Doherty in the short-lived ABC series Traveler and in 2010 played Bob Overton in the series Hellcats.

In 2013 he starred in the direct-to-video action film The Package alongside "Stone Cold" Steve Austin and Dolph Lundgren.

He also recurred as Maurice, father of Belle, in the popular ABC show Once Upon a Time.

Personal life
Eric mostly lives in Tsawwassen, British Columbia, Canada with his wife Peg and their two children.

Filmography

Television

Film

References

External links

1957 births
Living people
Canadian male film actors
People from St. Stephen, New Brunswick
Male actors from New Brunswick
20th-century Canadian male actors
21st-century Canadian male actors